Stephen Sarkisian (born March 8, 1974) is an American football coach and former player. He is the head football coach at the University of Texas at Austin, a position he has held since January 2021. Sarkisian served as the head football coach at the University of Washington from 2009 to 2013, then at the University of Southern California (USC) from 2014 to 2015. He played college football as a quarterback at Brigham Young University (BYU) and professionally with the Saskatchewan Roughriders of the Canadian Football League (CFL). Sarkisian served as the offensive coordinator for the Atlanta Falcons of the National Football League (NFL) from 2017 to 2018 and at the University of Alabama from 2019 to 2020.

Playing career

USC and El Camino College baseball
After a standout baseball and football career at West High School in Torrance, California, Sarkisian's size (6', 165 lb) did not attract any college football offers.  He began his collegiate athletic career in 1992 at the University of Southern California (USC) as a non-scholarship middle infielder on the Trojans baseball team.  He struggled playing NCAA Division I baseball and transferred after a semester to El Camino College, a two-year community college adjacent to his hometown of Torrance, where he played shortstop.

El Camino College football 
At the urging of El Camino head football coach John Featherstone, one of his instructors, Sarkisian restarted his football career.  As a redshirt freshman in 1993, Sarkisian earned All-Mission Conference honors. In his sophomore season, he was named a junior college All-American after setting a national junior college record by completing 72.4 percent of his passes.

BYU football

1995

As a junior, Sarkisian transferred to Brigham Young University in Provo, Utah, for the 1995 season.  He was recruited by DeWayne Walker, then an assistant coach for the BYU Cougars. Although Kansas State and Washington State showed interest, Sarkisian chose BYU primarily because the school boasted more combined Davey O'Brien- and Heisman-winning quarterbacks in the last decade than any other had in the previous 50 years of Division I-A.  The previous starting quarterback, John Walsh, was also from Torrance and a friend of Sarkisian. Walsh left school a year early to enter the 1995 NFL Draft, creating a void in the depth chart; Sarkisian accepted a scholarship with BYU in December 1994.

At BYU, Sarkisian was coached by offensive coordinator Norm Chow under head coach LaVell Edwards. As a junior, Sarkisian passed for 3,437 yards and 20 touchdowns, earning All-Western Athletic Conference honors. Sarkisian finished the season by completing 31 of 34 passes for 399 yards and three touchdowns in BYU's 45–28 victory over Fresno State. His completion percentage in the game (91.2 percent) set an NCAA record at that time.

1996

As a senior, Sarkisian opened BYU's 1996 season by passing for 536 yards and six touchdowns in the Cougars' 41–37 upset victory over Texas A&M in the Pigskin Classic. The 536 yards passing were the most ever by a player against Texas A&M.  Sarkisian finished the game with a 46-yard touchdown pass to K. O. Kealaluhi to seal the victory.

BYU finished the regular season with a 13–1 record, defeating Wyoming, 28–25, in the WAC Championship Game. Sarkisian passed for 4,027 yards and 33 touchdowns during the regular season.   His 173.6 passer rating led the entire NCAA. For his efforts, he was named WAC Offensive Player of the Year and a second-team All-American. Sarkisian was also awarded the Sammy Baugh Trophy as the nation's top passer, making him the seventh BYU quarterback to win the honor.  He was also featured on the cover of TV Guide in December 1996.  BYU finished the season with 19–15 win over Kansas State in the Cotton Bowl Classic. Sarkisian threw a pair of touchdown passes in the fourth quarter to lead the Cougars to a come-from-behind victory. BYU finished the season with a 14–1 record and ranked fifth in the nation in both the AP Poll and Coaches' Poll. The Cougars became the first Division I-A team in NCAA history to win 14 games in a single season.  Sarkisian's 162.0 career passing efficiency rating is 18th on the all-time NCAA list.

Sarkisian earned his bachelor's degree in sociology from BYU in 1997 after receiving his associate's degree in general studies from El Camino in 1994.

Canadian Football League
Sarkisian played professionally for three seasons, 1997 to 1999, for the Saskatchewan Roughriders in the Canadian Football League (CFL).  He was a starter in the 1999 season, finishing with 16 touchdown passes and 21 interceptions.  His team finished with a dismal 3–15 record, prompting Sarkisian to end his playing career.

Coaching career

El Camino College
Sarkisian's coaching career began in 2000 when he returned to El Camino College as its quarterbacks coach.

USC and Oakland Raiders
The following season, Sarkisian joined his former coach, Norm Chow, at USC.  Chow was hired as USC's offensive coordinator by new head coach Pete Carroll.  Sarkisian worked as an offensive assistant in 2001 and then as quarterbacks coach in 2002 and 2003.  In 2004, Sarkisian moved to the professional ranks as quarterbacks coach for the Oakland Raiders of the NFL. Oakland compiled more than 4,000 passing yards, ranking eighth out of 32 NFL teams in passing yardage.  Sarkisian returned to USC for the 2005 season with the title of assistant head coach added to his duties as quarterbacks coach.  In January 2007, Sarkisian interviewed with the Raiders for their vacant head coaching position, but pulled himself out of the running to stay at USC. Sarkisian was named to replace Lane Kiffin as USC's offensive coordinator when Kiffin took the head coaching job with the Raiders.

Washington

Following the completion of a winless 2008 season, the University of Washington introduced Sarkisian as its 23rd head football coach during a press conference in the Don James Center at Husky Stadium on December 8, 2008.  Sarkisian signed a contract that paid him $1.75 million in 2009, with a salary increasing to $2.3 million by 2013.  Down in Los Angeles, John Morton succeeded Sarkisian as offensive coordinator at USC.

In Sarkisian's first year as head coach in 2009, Washington scored a huge upset of Sarkisian's former team, defeating #3 USC 16–13 with a last second field goal.  Washington then lost six of their next seven games, but finished the season in strong fashion, dominating rival Washington State, 30–0, to claim the Apple Cup, and scoring another upset with a rout of #19 California, 42–10.  Washington finished the year with a 5–7 record, a dramatic improvement over the previous season, a winless 0–12.

With Pete Carroll's departure from USC to coach the Seattle Seahawks on January 9, 2010, Sarkisian was discussed in the media as a potential replacement, but Sarkisian stated that he had not received an offer to become head coach of the Trojans. Despite his public comments, Sarkisian was still considered a top candidate for the position by USC Athletic Director Mike Garrett. However, Sarkisian expressed reservations about leaving Washington after one year, and decided not to pursue the position.  Ultimately, Lane Kiffin was hired for the position.

In Sarkisian's second season as head coach of Washington, the Huskies went 6–6 in 2010. The Huskies defeated USC again with a game-ending field goal, this time in Los Angeles. At mid-season, UW had alternated losses and wins and was 3–3, then were outscored 138–30 in the next three games, all losses against Arizona, Stanford, and Oregon. They fell to 3–6, but finished the year on a high note with three consecutive wins and were bowl eligible for the first time since the 2002 season. The Huskies concluded the season with a stunning 19–7 victory over #18 Nebraska in the Holiday Bowl, avenging a 56–21 blowout home loss to the Huskers in September. It was their first winning season in nine years.

With star quarterback Jake Locker departing to the NFL, many expected the Huskies to regress in the 2011 season, Sarkisian's third. The Huskies started out a surprising 6–2 and were undefeated in conference play at the halfway point of the season; at one point, they were ranked in all major polls for the first time during his short tenure. But they then went 1–3 in their remaining conference games, with blowout defeats to Oregon, USC, and Oregon State. The Huskies subsequently lost in the Alamo Bowl to Baylor, 67–56, to finish 7–6 on the season.

In 2012, the Washington Huskies finished 7-6 yet again following a 28–26 loss to Boise State in the Maaco Bowl Las Vegas. As his previous campaigns had gone, Sarkisian's 2012 Washington team defeated most of the lower-level Pac-12 teams but were blown out by the upper-level ones. Sarkisian's consecutive seven-win seasons earned him the mocking nickname "Seven Win Steve". Sarkisian would go on to win eight games in 2013 before taking the head coaching job at USC prior to Washington's bowl game.

New contract
Sarkisian's original contract in 2009 was for five years and paid $1.75 million in guaranteed money for the first year, rising to $2.0 million in 2011 and $2.3 million in 2013. Following the 2010 season and bowl victory, he signed a new five-year contract that paid $2.25 million in guaranteed money in 2011, rising to $2.85 million in 2015.

Return to USC
On December 2, 2013, Sarkisian chose to return to USC, accepting the head coaching position. Sarkisian's goal was to get USC back to its winning ways with NCAA sanctions finally ending. Like Lane Kiffin, Sarkisian called all plays on offense and served as the de facto offensive coordinator.

Sarkisian dealt with some controversy before his first game as head coach, when defensive captain Josh Shaw told the team he suffered two high ankle sprains when he jumped from a balcony to save his drowning nephew. After numerous calls questioning the authenticity of the story, Shaw admitted he lied to the athletic department. Sarkisian suspended Shaw indefinitely.

On September 8, 2014, Sarkisian and USC athletic director Pat Haden were reprimanded by Pac-12 Conference commissioner Larry Scott for attempting "to influence the officiating, and ultimately the outcome of a contest" during the September 6 game with Stanford. Haden was fined $25,000.

2015 leave of absence and termination
On October 11, 2015, Haden announced Sarkisian would take an indefinite leave of absence. Haden contacted Sarkisian after he learned that Sarkisian had not shown up to a scheduled practice on October 11. During his conversation with Sarkisian, Haden said he became aware that Sarkisian was "not healthy" and asked Sarkisian to take an indefinite leave of absence. Offensive coordinator Clay Helton would serve as interim head coach in Sarkisian's absence.  ESPN later reported that Sarkisian came to a pre-practice meeting, only to have his assistants tell him to go home when he appeared to be intoxicated.  Scott Wolf, the USC beat writer for the Los Angeles Daily News, reported on Twitter that several players smelled alcohol on Sarkisian's breath.

On October 12, Haden announced that Sarkisian had been fired and named Helton as interim head coach for the remainder of the season (the "interim" tag was removed after the season).  He subsequently revealed that he had tried to call Sarkisian to notify him personally, but by then Sarkisian was on his way to an out-of-state rehab facility and could not be reached. According to ESPN, Haden had placed Sarkisian on a zero-tolerance policy regarding alcohol use after Sarkisian claimed to have mixed alcohol with medication, despite the fact that he appeared simply to have drunk far too heavily before giving a drunken and profanity-laced speech at a booster club event (Sarkisian apologized after the incident before the 2015 season began). The apparent intoxication at practice would have been grounds for termination.  However, multiple reports said that Sarkisian's assistants believed he was drunk during a game against Arizona State.

Hours before Sarkisian's firing, the Los Angeles Times reported that Sarkisian had been involved in numerous alcohol-related incidents while at the University of Washington.  Haden admitted that he had not done a public-records check on Sarkisian prior to hiring him.

Sarkisian filed a $30 million wrongful termination lawsuit against USC, but later agreed to move it to private arbitration. He eventually lost the suit and did not appeal, stating that he would respect the result and move on.

Alabama

In September 2016, Alabama hired Sarkisian as an analyst for their football team.

Following Lane Kiffin's departure to become the head coach at Florida Atlantic, Sarkisian was promoted to the Alabama offensive coordinator position on January 2, 2017. He stepped into the role in the National Championship game against Clemson. The Tide would lose narrowly to the Tigers in his first and only game of the 2016 season as offensive coordinator.

Atlanta Falcons
On February 7, 2017, Sarkisian was hired as offensive coordinator for the Atlanta Falcons, taking over for the recently departed Kyle Shanahan who left to become the head coach of the 49ers. The offense's scoring output, under his guidance, dropped from 33.8 points per game (leading the NFL in 2016) to 22.1 points per game in 2017. In 2018, the offense's scoring improved to 25.9 points per game. On December 31, 2018, he was fired as offensive coordinator.

Alabama (second stint) 

In January 2019, Alabama re-hired Sarkisian as the offensive coordinator. In 2020, Sarkisian served as interim head coach for Alabama's 42–13 victory over Auburn after Nick Saban had to be quarantined due to COVID-19 protocols.

During his second stint at Alabama, Sarkisian coached quarterbacks Mac Jones and Tua Tagovailoa. He won the Broyles Award, given to the nation's top coaching assistant, for his coaching during the 2020 season. He also won the FootballScoop Offensive Coordinator of the Year award, voted on by previous winners of the award.

Texas
On January 2, 2021, Sarkisian was named the 31st head football coach at University of Texas at Austin. His initial contract at Texas was six years, $34.2 million.

2021 season

At the beginning of Sarkisian's first season as the head football coach at Texas, the Longhorns were ranked No.21 in the AP Poll. Sarkisian began the year by leading the Longhorns to a 38–18 victory over the No.23 ranked Louisiana Ragin' Cajuns. In Week 2 of the 2021 season, the Longhorns were defeated 21–40 by the Arkansas Razorbacks, in the first matchup in the Arkansas–Texas football rivalry since the 2014 Texas Bowl. In the following weeks, Sarkisian led the Longhorns to a 58–0 victory over Rice, a 70–35 victory over Texas Tech, and a 32–27 victory over TCU. The Longhorns then proceeded to lose six consecutive games, which the program had not seen since the 1956 season. Though Sarkisian and the Longhorns finished the season with a disappointing 5–7 record, some bright spots included the second best offense in the Big 12 with 35.3 points per game and wide receiver Xavier Worthy receiving True Freshman All-American honors as well as being elected Big 12 Offensive Freshman of the Year and earning a spot on the 2021 All-Big 12 First Team.

Personal life
Born in Torrance, California, Sarkisian is the youngest of seven children, the only one in the family born in California; the older six siblings were born in Massachusetts. Sarkisian is of Armenian and Irish ancestry. His father is an Armenian who was born and raised in Tehran, Iran before immigrating to the United States at the age of 18 to attend college. Sarkisian's mother is an Irish-American from Massachusetts.  Sarkisian is Catholic. 

In April 2015, it was reported that Sarkisian and his wife filed for divorce. Sarkisian and his ex-wife have three children, two daughters and a son. Their names are Taylor, Ashley, and Brady. Sarkisian has since married Loreal Smith, a former collegiate track star and coach.

Head coaching record

See also
 List of NCAA major college football yearly passing leaders

References

External links
 Texas profile
 Alabama profile
 USC profile 
 Washington profile 
 Just Sports Stats

1974 births
Living people
American football quarterbacks
American players of Canadian football
Alabama Crimson Tide football coaches
Atlanta Falcons coaches
Canadian football quarterbacks
BYU Cougars football players
El Camino Warriors football coaches
El Camino Warriors football players
Oakland Raiders coaches
National Football League offensive coordinators
Saskatchewan Roughriders players
Texas Longhorns football coaches
USC Trojans baseball players
USC Trojans football coaches
Washington Huskies football coaches
Brigham Young University alumni
Coaches of American football from California
Players of American football from Torrance, California
American people of Iranian descent
American people of Armenian descent
American people of Irish descent
Ethnic Armenian sportspeople
Catholics from California